Konstantin Ivanovich Kobets (16 July 1939 – 31 December 2012) was a Russian army general. In early 1991 he was serving as Deputy Chief of the Soviet General Staff for communications.

Biography 
Born in Kiev, Kobets supported then President of the RSFSR Boris Yeltsin during the August coup of 1991. From August 19 until September 9, 1991, Konstantin Kobets was Defense Minister of the RSFSR (albeit there was no ministry). This post was then abolished.

He was chair of the Russian Government's military reform committee in late 1991. In that position he developed a plan for the creation of the Commonwealth of Independent States Armed Forces. This plan was presented to a council of defence officials of the Soviet republics on 26–27 December 1991. However it was not adopted by the meeting and was superseded in any case by the effective breakup of the former Soviet Armed Forces among the former republics of the Soviet Union.

From September 1992 Kobets was Chief Military Inspector of the Armed Forces of the Russian Federation, and from January 1995 he was Secretary of State - Deputy Minister of Defence of the Russian Federation.

He was sentenced to two years in prison in 1997 for corruption and misuse of defense ministry funds.

References 

1939 births
2012 deaths
Communist Party of the Soviet Union members
Military personnel from Kyiv
Army generals (Soviet Union)
Ukrainian emigrants to Russia
Burials in Troyekurovskoye Cemetery
Military Academy of the General Staff of the Armed Forces of the Soviet Union alumni
Defenders of the White House (1991)
Deputy Defence Ministers of Russia